Sol Kyong (or  ; born June 8, 1990) is a North Korean judoka. She represents the sports team of the Pyongyang University of Mechanical Engineering.

References

External links
 
 
 

1990 births
Living people
North Korean female judoka
Asian Games medalists in judo
Judoka at the 2010 Asian Games
Judoka at the 2014 Asian Games
Asian Games silver medalists for North Korea
Asian Games bronze medalists for North Korea
Judoka at the 2016 Summer Olympics
Olympic judoka of North Korea
Medalists at the 2010 Asian Games
Medalists at the 2014 Asian Games
21st-century North Korean women